Tomáš Töpfer (born 10 January 1951) is a Czech film and television actor and politician. He was named Best Actor at the 1995 Alfréd Radok Awards. At the 2006 Thalia Awards he won the category of Best Actor in an Operetta or Musical.

Selected filmography
How Poets Are Enjoying Their Lives (1987)
Konec básníků v Čechách (1993)
Život na zámku (1995,1998)Četnické humoresky (television, 1997)Jak básníci neztrácejí naději (2004)The Sorrow of Mrs. Schneider (2008)Czech Peace (2010)My Uncle Archimedes (2018)Rašín'' (2018)

References

External links

1951 births
Living people
Czech male film actors
Czech male television actors
Czechoslovak male film actors
Jewish Czech politicians
Male actors from Prague
20th-century Czech actors
21st-century Czech actors
Civic Democratic Party (Czech Republic) Senators
Recipients of the Thalia Award
Academy of Performing Arts in Prague alumni